Le Canonnier may refer to:
 		 		
 Le Canonnier (Hotel) - a hotel in Mauritius 	
 Stade Le Canonnier -  a Football stadium in Belgium